Central Nova is a federal electoral district in Nova Scotia, Canada that was represented in the House of Commons of Canada from 1968 until 1996. In 1996, Antigonish County and part of Guysborough County were placed with Pictou County in a new electoral boundaries configuration to form the electoral district of Pictou-Antigonish-Guysborough. A new version of Central Nova was established in 2003 and — in conjunction with the Pictou-Antigonish-Guysborough iteration — represented a significant electoral boundaries change with specific reference to Antigonish County. Between 1867 and 1997, Antigonish County was not in a riding that included Pictou County; rather, it comprised either its own electoral district (Antigonish), or part of other districts shared with Eastern Nova Scotia (Antigonish-Guysborough) and Cape Breton Island communities (Cape Breton Highlands Canso, 1968–1997). In 2013, part of Antigonish County was "placed back" with communities in the electoral district of Cape Breton Canso, a riding which had emerged in part from the former Cape Breton Highlands Canso riding in 1996. The current version of Central Nova includes Pictou County, parts of Antigonish and Guysborough Counties (including the Town of Antigonish and the Municipality of the District of St. Mary's) and extends into Halifax Regional Municipality.

Demographics

From the 2021 census

Ethnic groups:
White: 91.4%
First Nations: 1.1%
Black: 1.8%

Languages:
English: 95.4%
French: 1.1%
Dutch: 0.2%
Other: 3.3%

Religions:
Protestant: 36.5%
Catholic: 27.6%
No religious affiliation: 34.0%

Age:
0 to 14 years: 13.8%
15 to 64 years: 60.1%
65 years and over: 26.1%
85 years and over: 2.8%

Median Age:
50.0

Median total income:
$32,000

Average total income:
$40,520

Median household income:
$66,500

Average household income:
$81,600

Geography
The district covers all or part of the following counties:

 Pictou County (all)
 Antigonish County (part)
 Guysborough County (part)
 Halifax County (part)

Specifically, it includes the following municipal corporations:

 Municipality of the County of Pictou
 The towns of New Glasgow, Stellarton, Pictou, Westville, Trenton, and Antigonish
 Municipality of the County of Antigonish
 Municipality of the District of St. Mary's
 Halifax Regional Municipality (east of Jeddore Oyster Pond and Marinette).

Communities include:

Pictou County
 New Glasgow
 Stellarton
 Westville
 Trenton
 Pictou
 River John

Antigonish County (as part of the county portion placed in Central Nova)
 Antigonish

Guysborough County (as part of the county portion placed in Central Nova)
 Goshen
 Sherbrooke
 Trafalgar
 Marie Joseph

Halifax County (as part of the county portion placed in Central Nova)
 Sheet Harbour
 Port Dufferin
 Lake Charlotte
 Jeddore Oyster Pond

The electoral district has an area of 8,439 km2.

Political geography
In 2008, the riding had the unusual scenario of having Green Party leader Elizabeth May run without any Liberal opposition. Thus, the race was mostly between Conservative candidate Peter MacKay and May. May's support was concentrated in the community of Antigonish. Outside this area, she won just a few pockets of support. She was nearly shut out in the New Glasgow metropolitan area, where she won just one poll. MacKay won most of the rest of the riding, and the NDP picked up three polls.

History

The district was created in 1966 from Antigonish—Guysborough (with part of Guysborough added to Central Nova, while Antigonish County and a portion of Guysborough were placed with the Cape Breton Highlands Canso riding), Colchester—Hants, and Pictou. In sum, in 1966, Central Nova consisted of Pictou County, southern Colchester County, eastern Halifax County, and western Guysborough County. In 1976, it gained some territory in Halifax County (eastern central portion), and it lost its territory in Colchester County. In 1987, it lost most of Guysborough County except for the most extreme western point, and gained all of central and central western Halifax County. In 1996, it was merged into Pictou—Antigonish—Guysborough, and Sackville—Eastern Shore.

The electoral district was re-created in 2003: 93.3% of the riding came from Pictou—Antigonish—Guysborough riding, and 6.7% came from Sackville—Musquodoboit Valley—Eastern Shore.  In the 2004 election, Conservative Party candidate Peter MacKay, who had represented Pictou—Antigonish—Guysborough, was returned to the House of Commons from Central Nova. He was re-elected in the 2006 election.

Green Party leader Elizabeth May contested the seat in the 2008 federal election.  In a move that startled political observers, Liberal leader Stéphane Dion announced on April 13, 2007, that his party would not contest the seat in order to give May a better chance of winning, a move that marked the first time in decades that the Liberals did not field a full slate of candidates in a general election.  In return, the Greens (who also fielded a full slate in the last election) did not contest Dion's Montreal riding. After coming in second to Peter MacKay, May announced she would not run in Central Nova in the next federal election.

Its new boundaries, determined during 2012 federal electoral boundaries redistribution, have been legally defined in the 2013 representation order. The new boundaries encompass most of the pre-2012 riding as well as a portion of Nova Scotia represented in the current electoral districts of Cumberland—Colchester—Musquodoboit Valley and Sackville—Eastern Shore. It lost 9% of its previous territory to Cape Breton—Canso,  territory that, for decades prior to this, had already been part of Cape Breton Highlands Canso. It came into effect upon the call of the 42nd Canadian federal election, which took place on 19 October 2015.

Members of Parliament

This riding has elected the following Members of Parliament:

Election results

2021 general election

2019 general election

2015 general election

2011 general election

2008 general election

2006 general election

2004 general election

1993 general election

1988 general election

1984 general election

1983 by-election

1980 general election

1979 general election

1974 general election

1972 general election

1971 by-election

1968 general election

See also
 List of Canadian federal electoral districts
 Past Canadian electoral districts

References

Notes

External links
 Riding history for Central Nova (1966–1996) from the Library of Parliament
 Riding history for Central Nova (2003– ) from the Library of Parliament

Nova Scotia federal electoral districts
Antigonish, Nova Scotia
Guysborough County, Nova Scotia
New Glasgow, Nova Scotia
Politics of Halifax, Nova Scotia